Misaeng: Incomplete Life is a 2014 South Korean television series based on the webtoon series of the same title by Yoon Tae-ho. It aired on tvN from October 17 to December 20, 2014, on Fridays and Saturdays at 20:30 (KST) for 20 episodes.

The title translates to Go terminology meaning "an incomplete life" (literally "not yet" (미) "birth" (생), meaning "not yet alive"). Misaeng: Incomplete Life was the first Korean drama to film on location in Jordan, where actors Im Si-wan and Lee Sung-min shot the series's prologue in Amman, Petra, and Wadi Rum. Yim reprised his role as the protagonist, which he played in an earlier film adaptation, Incomplete Life: Prequel (2013).

The series became a cultural phenomenon and recorded high viewership ratings for a cable network program in Korea. tvN is known for its record breaking dramas.

Synopsis
Since he was a child, the board game baduk has been everything to Jang Geu-rae. But when he fails at achieving his dream of becoming a professional baduk player, Geu-rae must leave his isolated existence and enter the real world armed with nothing but a GED high school equivalency diploma on his resume. Through an acquaintance's recommendation, he gets hired as an intern at One International, a large trading company.

There, Geu-rae meets his boss, manager Oh Sang-shik, who's a workaholic and has a warm personality; fellow intern Ahn Young-yi, who attracts her colleagues' ire because of her impressive educational credentials and by being extremely competent at any task; and Jang Baek-gi, a geeky co-worker whose anxious nature masks his inner ambition. Geu-rae learns to navigate and adapt to corporate culture, with baduk as his guide.

Cast

Main
 Im Si-wan as Jang Geu-rae 
Kim Ye-jun as young Jang Geu-rae
He formerly aspired to be a professional baduk player, to which he had devoted his life since childhood, but, unable to achieve this goal, he joins One International, although he has no formal skills or training. He joins Sales Team 3 as two-year contract employee at One International.
 Lee Sung-min as Oh Sang-shik
 Kang So-ra as Ahn Young-yi.  She joins Resource Team as permanent employee at One International.
 Kang Ha-neul as Jang Baek-gi. He joins Steel Team as permanent employee at One International.
 Byun Yo-han as Han Seok-yool. He joins Textile Team as permanent employee at One International.

Supporting

One International Sales Teams

Team 3 (to which Geu-rae is assigned)
 Kim Dae-myung as Kim Dong-shik
 Park Hae-joon as Chun Kwan-woong
 Kim Hee-won as Park Jong-shik
 Seo Yoon-ah as Lee Eun-ji (ep. 14)
 Kim Won-hae as Park Young-ho (ep. 20)

Team 1
 Shin Eun-jung as Sun Ji-young
 Kim Sang-won as Mr. Um
 Shin Dong-hoon as Cha Soo-jin

Team 2
 Ryu Tae-ho as Go Dong-ho
 Park Jin-soo as Assistant Manager Hwang
 Kim Ga-young as Jang Mi-ra

Others
 Yoon Jong-hoon as Lee Sang-hyun
 Yeo Eui-joo as Jang Ki-seok
 Kim Jong-soo as Kim Boo-ryun
 Shin Eun-jung as Sun Ji-young
 Kim Kyung-ryong as Lee Shin-tae
 Nam Kyung-eup as CEO of One International
 Lee Geung-young as Choi Young-hoo
 Son Jong-hak as Ma Bok-ryul
 Jung Hee-tae as Jung Hee-seok
 -- as Cha Jung-ho
 Jang Hyuk-jin as Moon Sang-pil
 Choi Gwi-hwa as Park Yong-gu
 Shin Jae-hoon as Yoo Hyung-ki
 Jeon Seok-ho as Ha Sung-joon
 Oh Min-suk as Kang Hae-joon
 Tae In-ho as Song Jeon-shik
 Park Jin-seo as Shin Da-in
 Hwang Seok-jeong as Kim Sun-joo
 Jo Hyun-sik as Kim Seok-ho
 Kim Jung-hak as Lee Seok-joong
 Kwak In-joon as Audit team leader
 Han Kap-soo as One International Jordan branch manager
 Choi Jae-woong as One International Jordan branch employee
 Sung Byung-sook as Geu-rae's mother
 Nam Myung-ryul as Geu-rae's baduk teacher
 Lee Si-won as Ha Jung-yeon
 -- as Senior colleague Kim
 Oh Yoon-hong as Oh Sang-shik's wife
 Lee Seung-joon as Shin Woo-hyun

Cameo appearances 
 Cho Hun-hyun (cameo)
 Yoo Chang-hyuk (cameo)
 Oh Jung-se as Husband of Chungsol's CEO (cameo, ep. 20)
 Yoo Jae-myung as Factory worker (ep. 16)

Ratings
In this table,  represent the lowest ratings and  represent the highest ratings.

Awards and nominations

Source material

With his webtoon, author Yoon Tae-ho drew an analogy between life in modern society and the game of baduk, a chess-like strategy board game. He also wrote vivid descriptions of the everyday life and struggles of Korean corporate culture as his flawed characters deal with the fierce competition for survival, interpersonal work relationships and office politics. Misaeng: Incomplete Life gained immense popularity among Korean white-collar workers in their twenties and thirties largely because its realism resonated with their experiences. It drew 1 billion hits when it was published on online portal Daum from September 2012 to October 2013, and the nine-volume paperback version sold 900,000 copies. It is now considered a must-read comic in the country.

Remake

 Between July 17 and September 18, 2016, Misaeng: Incomplete Life will have a Japanese drama remake titled HOPE〜期待ゼロの新入社員〜.
 In June 2018, it was announced that Misaeng: Incomplete Life will have a Chinese drama remake titled Ordinary Glory; starring Bai Jingting, Mark Chao and Qiao Xin.

References

External links
 

Misaeng webtoon on Daum 

2014 South Korean television series debuts
2014 South Korean television series endings
TVN (South Korean TV channel) television dramas
Television shows based on South Korean webtoons
South Korean comedy-drama television series
South Korean workplace television series
South Korean television series remade in other languages